Abdullah Al Muzayen (born February 8, 1988, in Kuwait) is a professional squash player who represents Kuwait. He reached a career-high world ranking of World No. 33 in May, 2013. He won the gold medal at the 17th Asian Games at Incheon

References

External links 
 
 

1988 births
Living people
Kuwaiti squash players
Asian Games medalists in squash
Asian Games gold medalists for Kuwait
Asian Games bronze medalists for Kuwait
Squash players at the 2010 Asian Games
Squash players at the 2014 Asian Games
Medalists at the 2014 Asian Games